Jonathan V. Last (aka JVL; born May 6, 1974) is an American journalist and author. He is the editor of The Bulwark, and previously worked as a senior writer and digital editor at The Weekly Standard. He is the author of What to Expect When No One's Expecting (2013).

Early life and education
Last was born in 1974 in Camden, New Jersey. He grew up in Woodbury and Moorestown Township, New Jersey. Last is a graduate of Johns Hopkins University where he studied molecular biology. According to Tim Miller, had Last gone to a less competitive college, Last would be a doctor.

Career
Last writes frequently for The Wall Street Journal and has also written for the Los Angeles Times, The Washington Post, the New York Post, Salon, The Washington Times, Slate,  the New York Press, First Things, the Claremont Review of Books, and other publications. He has appeared on several radio and television outlets. He formerly wrote weekly columns for The Philadelphia Inquirer and The Daily.
 
Last regularly writes data-driven analyses of demographic trends, including articles and blog posts on the American birth rate, the voting patterns of the rising number of single Americans, and the collapsing fertility rates in Korea.  His first book, What to Expect When No One’s Expecting, is a detailed examination of the origins and consequences of these and related trends.

Last also frequently writes on politics and popular culture. He was an early skeptic about Mitt Romney's electoral prospects in the 2012 election, drawing attention to the candidate's history of failing to make himself likeable to voters. Last, who has been described as the "Weekly Standard’s resident geek," avidly collected comic books in his youth and often writes about them, most notably in an account of the death of Marvel Comics'''s Captain America. Last is also known for creating the Star Wars meme that the Galactic Empire was really a force for good.

Last maintains his own blog and website, JonathanLast.com (formerly the Galley Slaves blog, with fellow Weekly Standard'' staffers Victorino Matus and David Skinner).

Bibliography

References

External links
 JonathanLast.com
 

American bloggers
American columnists
American male journalists
Writers from Camden, New Jersey
People from Moorestown, New Jersey
People from Woodbury, New Jersey
The Philadelphia Inquirer people
The Weekly Standard people
Living people
1974 births
21st-century American non-fiction writers
American male bloggers